Alleruusakasiit, former spelling Agdlerussakasit, is a mountain in the Kujalleq municipality, southern Greenland.

Geography
This mountain is a 1,743.7 m high largely unglaciated rocky summit rising 2.8 km west of the shore of Torsukattak Fjord located across the valley south of Angiartarfik. 

Alleruusakasiit is famous for its massive eastern cliff, known as the Thumbnail.

See also
 Big wall climbing
 List of mountains in Greenland

References

Mountains of Greenland
Kujalleq